The Great Southern is an Australian experiential tourism train operated by Journey Beyond Rail Expeditions between Adelaide and Brisbane both ways. The inaugural journey departed from Adelaide on 6 December 2019. While Roma Street station handles all long-distance rail services to and from Brisbane, the Great Southern does not operate to Roma Street due to the length of the train. Instead, the service terminates at a freight terminal located in the southern suburb of Acacia Ridge.

Similar to Journey Beyond's other luxury rail holidays on The Ghan and the Indian Pacific, the Great Southern is a slow journey across the country with a series of off-train guided tours along the route. The Adelaide to Brisbane service takes three days and features guided tours of the Grampians National Park in Victoria, Canberra and beaches along the northern coast of New South Wales, while the Brisbane to Adelaide service takes four days with beachside dining in northern New South Wales, a guided tour of the Hunter Valley and Newcastle, and a stop at the Twelve Apostles.

References

Interstate rail in Australia
Named passenger trains of Australia
Railway services introduced in 2019
2019 establishments in Australia
Rail transport in South Australia
Rail transport in Queensland
Luxury trains